Bonaire holds elections for the island council and the electoral colleges for the Senate.

See also
 Electoral calendar
 Electoral system

External links

 
Bonaire